The 1960 Chicago White Sox season was the team's 60th season in the major leagues, and its 61st season overall. They finished with a record of 87–67, good enough for third place in the American League, 10 games behind the first-place New York Yankees.

Offseason 
 December 6, 1959: Johnny Romano, Bubba Phillips, and Norm Cash were traded by the White Sox to the Cleveland Indians for Minnie Miñoso, Dick Brown, Don Ferrarese, and Jake Striker.
 December 9, 1959: Johnny Callison was traded by the White Sox to the Philadelphia Phillies for Gene Freese.
 January 9, 1960: Chico Carrasquel was signed as a free agent by the White Sox.

Regular season 
 During the season, the White Sox became the first major sports team to put player names on the backs of uniforms. The White Sox were also the first to misspell a players name. During a road trip to New York, Ted Kluszewski became the first player to appear in a game with his name misspelled. There was a backwards "z" and an "x" instead of the second "k" in his name.
 Nellie Fox set an American League record for most consecutive games started at second base. The streak started on August 7, 1955, and ended on September 3, 1960.
 During the American League meetings of 1960, White Sox owner Bill Veeck announced that he was interested in selling his shares in the White Sox with the intention of starting an expansion franchise in Southern California with former player Hank Greenberg. Charlie Finley had offered to buy Veeck's shares in the White Sox for $4.2 million but withdrew the offer.

Season standings

Record vs. opponents

1960 Opening Day lineup 
 Luis Aparicio, SS
 Nellie Fox, 2B
 Minnie Miñoso, LF
 Ted Kluszewski, 1B
 Gene Freese, 3B
 Sherm Lollar, C
 Al Smith, RF
 Jim Landis, CF
 Early Wynn, P

Notable transactions 
 April 18, 1960: Barry Latman was traded by the White Sox to the Cleveland Indians for Herb Score.
 April 23, 1960: Chico Carrasquel was released by the White Sox.
 June 18, 1960: Joe Ginsberg was signed as a free agent by the White Sox.
 August 13, 1960: Don Prohovich (minors) and $15,000 were traded by the White Sox to the Milwaukee Braves for Earl Averill, Jr.

Roster

Player stats

Batting 
Note: G = Games played; AB = At bats; R = Runs scored; H = Hits; 2B = Doubles; 3B = Triples; HR = Home runs; RBI = Runs batted in; BB = Base on balls; SO = Strikeouts; AVG = Batting average; SB = Stolen bases

Pitching 
Note: W = Wins; L = Losses; ERA = Earned run average; G = Games pitched; GS = Games started; SV = Saves; IP = Innings pitched; H = Hits allowed; R = Runs allowed; ER = Earned runs allowed; HR = Home runs allowed; BB = Walks allowed; K = Strikeouts

Farm system 

LEAGUE CHAMPIONS: Pensacola

Notes

References 
 1960 Chicago White Sox at Baseball Reference

Chicago White Sox seasons
Chicago White Sox season
Chicago